Vtorovo is a rural locality (a selo) and the administrative center of Vtorovskoye Rural Settlement, Kameshkovsky District, Vladimir Oblast, Russia. The population was 990 as of 2010. There are 8 streets.

Geography 
Vtorovo is located 20 km southwest of Kameshkovo (the district's administrative centre) by road. Mirny is the nearest rural locality.

References 

Rural localities in Kameshkovsky District
Vladimirsky Uyezd